Axinella loribellae is a species of sponge in the family, Axinellidae, which was first described by Belinda Alvarez and John Hooper in 2009. It is found in the waters off Northern Australia in the IMCRA Northern Shelf province.

References

External links
Axinella loribellae occurrence data from GBIF

Axinellidae
Animals described in 2009
Sponges of Australia
Taxa named by John Hooper (marine biologist)